Chester College International School (CCIS) is a full-accredited international American-Spanish Day and Boarding school founded in 1985 by  Juan Pías and Dolores Peleteiro, for students from Early Learning (age 3) up to Grade 12 (age 18), located in the outskirts of Santiago de Compostela, Spain. It is accredited by COGNIA and the Spanish Ministry of Education.

References

External links 
 

Schools in Galicia
Private schools in Spain
Boarding schools in Spain
American international schools in Spain
Educational institutions established in 1985
1985 establishments in Spain